Carol K. Brown is an American artist that works with sculpture, painting, photography, video and installation. She has received the State of Florida Fine Arts Fellowship (1983), Southeastern Center for Contemporary Art Fellowship (1986), and the National Endowment for the Arts Fellowship (1984 and 1986). Her work is owned by the Perez Art Museum Miami, the Museum of Contemporary Art San Diego, the Memphis Brooks Museum of Art, and the Herbert F. Johnson Museum of Art at Cornell University. She is a professor of sculpture at the New World School of the Arts  in Miami.

Museum and public collections 
Her art is owned by the Denver Art Museum, Colorado; University of Colorado, Boulder; City of Orlando, Art in Public Spaces in Miami-Dade County Art in Public Spaces, and Miami-Dade County Public Library.

References

American artists
Living people
Year of birth missing (living people)